The following is a list of 2022 box office number-one films in South Korea by week. When the number-one film in gross is not the same as the number-one film in admissions, both are listed.

Highest-grossing films

See also
 List of South Korean films of 2022
 Impact of the COVID-19 pandemic on cinema
 List of 2021 box office number-one films in South Korea
 2022 in South Korea

References

External links

2022
South Korea
2022 in South Korean cinema